Merivel: A Man of His Time is a novel by Rose Tremain, published in 2012. It is set in 17th century England, France and Switzerland and is a sequel to Restoration. It was short listed for the Walter Scott Prize for historical fiction in 2013.

References

2012 British novels
Historical novels
Novels set in Norfolk
Chatto & Windus books